State Route 155 is a state highway in the U.S. state of Washington, running from  U.S. Route 2 near Coulee City over Disautel Pass to U.S. Route 97 and State Route 20 in the city of Omak.  It is the main north–south route through the area around Grand Coulee Dam.

Route description

State Route 155 begins at an intersection with U.S. Route 2 northeast of Coulee City. From there, the highway heads north, paralleling the shore of Banks Lake for much of the southern part of the route.  After passing Steamboat Rock State Park, it crosses over Osborn Bay Lake before passing through Electric City. It then intersects State Route 174 in Grand Coulee. The highway then heads northeast, crossing the Columbia River just north of the Grand Coulee Dam.

As the highway descends from the pass, it approaches the town of Omak on Omak Avenue. On the east side of the town, it crosses under the two-lane carriageway of U.S. Route 97 and State Route 20. Since there is no access immediately at this underpass, State Route 155 continues three blocks west before turning south along Dayton Street to access U.S. Route 97.

At the intersection of Omak Avenue and Dayton Street, a spur route of State Route 155 begins and continues west along Omak Avenue to terminate at State Route 215 in downtown Omak. This was the original alignment of State Route 155 before U.S. Route 97 was realigned onto its current bypass.

History

When State Route 155 was first established in 1964, U.S. Route 97 passed through downtown Omak and Okanogan on what is now State Route 215, rather than on its easterly bypass as it does today.  Thus, State Route 155 continued west on what is now State Route 155 Spur to terminate at U.S. Route 97 in downtown Omak.  When the US 97 bypass was built a few years later, State Route 155 was rerouted onto its current alignment.

Prior to the 1964 highway renumbering, the section of State Route 155 from Coulee City to the Grand Coulee Dam was numbered Secondary State Highway 2F. From Grand Coulee to Omak, it was numbered Secondary State Highway 10A.

Spur route

It continues west from the US 97/SR 20 underpass and crosses over the Okanogan River before ending at an intersection with SR 215. The spur route was designated on the former route of SR 155 prior to the construction of the US 97 expressway in eastern Omak.

WSDOT plans to rebuild the spur route's crossing of the Okanogan River in 2025 with wider lanes by replacing the sidewalks with a parallel pedestrian bridge.

Major intersections

References

External links
Highways of Washington State

155
155
Transportation in Grant County, Washington
Transportation in Okanogan County, Washington